Ken Martin Gipson (born 24 February 1996) is a German professional footballer who plays as a right-back for Carl Zeiss Jena.

Club career
In June 2017, Gipson signed for 2. Bundesliga side SV Sandhausen on a two-year contract until 2019.

In August 2019, Gipson joined Sonnenhof Großaspach on a free transfer.

International career
Gipŝon is German-born and of American descent, and is eligible for national teams of both countries.

References

External links 
 
 

1996 births
Living people
People from Ludwigsburg
Sportspeople from Stuttgart (region)
German people of American descent
German footballers
Footballers from Baden-Württemberg
Association football fullbacks
2. Bundesliga players
3. Liga players
Regionalliga players
RB Leipzig II players
RB Leipzig players
SV Sandhausen players
SG Sonnenhof Großaspach players
FC Carl Zeiss Jena players